Wild-goose chase or wild goose chase may refer to:

 A pursuit of something unattainable or non-existent, such as in a fool's errand or snipe hunt
 The Wild Goose Chase, a comedy stage play written by John Fletcher and first published in 1621
 The Wild Goose Chase (1915 film), a 1915 American comedy-drama film directed by Cecil B. DeMille 
 The Wild Goose Chase (1932 film), a 1932 Van Beuren cartoon
 Wycliffe's Wild Goose Chase, a crime novel by W. J. Burley